Luis González Seara (7 June 1936 – 23 April 2016) was a Spanish sociologist and politician.

References

1936 births
2016 deaths
Members of the 1st Congress of Deputies (Spain)
Members of the Senate of Spain
Spanish sociologists
Union of the Democratic Centre (Spain) politicians
Complutense University of Madrid alumni